Channel 66 refers to several television stations:

Canada
The following television stations operate on virtual channel 66 in Canada:
 CHNU-DT in Fraser Valley, British Columbia
 CKWS-DT-1 in Brighton, Ontario

Mexico
The following television stations operate on virtual channel 66 in Mexico:
 XHILA-TDT in Mexicali, Baja California

See also
 Channel 66 virtual TV stations in the United States.

66